The men's 3000 metres steeplechase at the 2017 World Championships in Athletics was held at the London Olympic Stadium on 6 and 8 August.

After a temporary retirement announced immediately after the Olympic race, 4-time champion, seven time medalist Ezekiel Kemboi (Kenya), once known for his flamboyant frohawk hairstyles was back, now as a 35-year-old without a hair on his head.  His historic record was well known, but his semi-final was his fastest race of the year making him an unknown quantity.  In fact, the entire 2015 podium and the 2016 Olympic podium were in this event, though 2008 Olympic champion and 2015 bronze medalist Brimin Kipruto (Kenya) at age 33 didn't make the final.

Summary
In the final Conseslus Kipruto (Kenya) went to the front, but he didn't set a blistering pace to burn off the competition, instead he kept control of the race.  Jairus Birech (Kenya) and Evan Jager (USA) stayed close behind. After a leisurely 2:51.81 first kilometre, after which entire Ethiopian team of Tesfaye Deriba, Tafese Seboka and Getnet Wale moved ahead to push the pace.  Kemboi was biding his time along the rail.  Jacob Araptany (Uganda) lost his shoe and stopped in the middle of the track to fix it, taking him completely out of contention.

After four laps, Jager moved to the front and increased the pace, with only Kipruto, Birech, Ezekiel Kemboi and Soufiane El Bakkali (Morocco) staying in the front group with him. Birech, and later Kemboi, dropped away, and Jager led the remaining trio until they reached the beginning of the final backstretch, where Kipruto accelerated past Jager, followed by El Bakkali. By the water jump, El Bakkali had pulled even, but Kipruto had more speed down the final straightaway. Jager held third place despite a late run from Mahiedine Mekhissi.

Records
Before the competition records were as follows:

The following records were set at the competition:

Qualification standard
The standard to qualify automatically for entry was 8:32.00.

Schedule
The event schedule, in local time (UTC+1), was as follows:

Results

Heats
The first round took place on 6 August in three heats as follows:

The first three in each heat ( Q ) and the next six fastest ( q ) qualified for the final. The overall results were as follows:

Final
The final took place on 8 August at 21:11. The results were as follows (photo finish):

References

Steeplechase
Steeplechase at the World Athletics Championships